Russell Ambrose "Buster" Brayshaw (January 17, 1918 – February 25, 1993) was a Canadian professional ice hockey left wing who played forty-three games in the National Hockey League with the Chicago Black Hawks. He was a fill-in player for the Hawks while others served in World War II. Brayshaw spent the four following years in the American Hockey League.

He died in Abbotsford, British Columbia in 1993.

References

External links

1918 births
1993 deaths
Brandon Wheat Kings coaches
Canadian expatriates in the United States
Canadian ice hockey coaches
Canadian ice hockey left wingers
Chicago Blackhawks players
Ice hockey people from Saskatchewan
People from Rosthern, Saskatchewan